Hemipenthes alba is a species of bee flies in the family Bombyliidae, known from Mexico; the name was misspelled as albus in the original publication, but as it is an adjective meaning "white", it must be corrected under the rules of gender agreement in the ICZN to alba.

References

Bombyliidae
Insects described in 2009